The Romania national American football team is the official American football senior national team of Romania. It is organized by the Federaţia Română de Fotbal American (FRFA). It gets players from teams of the National American Football Championship of Romania (CNFA).

See also 
 Romanian American Football Federation
 National American Football Championship of Romania
 Zoltán Meskó

External links
Official website  at FRFA.

Romania
American football in Romania
American Football
2010 establishments in Romania
American football teams established in 2010
National sports teams established in 2010